Truzhenik is a rural locality (a village) in Orlovsky Selsoviet, Blagoveshchensky District, Bashkortostan, Russia. The population was 39 as of 2010. There is 1 street.

Geography 
Truzhenik is located 24 km north of Blagoveshchensk (the district's administrative centre) by road. Orlovka is the nearest rural locality.

References 

Rural localities in Blagoveshchensky District